Luckymore "Lucky" Mkosana (born 30 September 1987) is a Zimbabwean footballer who currently plays for Tampa Bay Rowdies in the USL Championship.

Playing career

College and Amateur
Mkosana played college soccer at Dartmouth College between 2008 and 2011. During his time at Dartmouth, Mkosana was named Ivy League Player of the Year (2011), All-Ivy League First Team (2008, 2009, 2010, 2011), Soccer America Freshman, All-America First Team, College Soccer News Freshman, All-America First Team and Ivy League Rookie of the Year (2008). He became Dartmouth’s all-time career leader with 34 career goals, breaking a record that had stood since 1953. Mkosana played for USL Premier Development League club Michigan Bucks in 2011.

Chicago Fire selected Mkosana in the second round (No. 23 overall) of the 2012 MLS SuperDraft, but wasn't signed by the club.

Club

Harrisburg City Islanders
Mkosana signed with USL Pro club Harrisburg City Islanders in May 2012. Mkosana became a regular goalscorer for the City Islanders over the next two seasons, scoring 20 goals and providing 4 assists during the regular season play. The latter half of the 2013 season, Mkosana scored 10 goals in the 7 matches (including two hattricks) and earn USL Team of the Week honors for four consecutive weeks.

Tampa Bay Rowdies
At the conclusion of the USL 2013 season, Mkosana secured a loan deal to Tampa Bay Rowdies in the NASL. After completion of a successful loan spell, Mkosana signed a permanent deal with the Rowdies in January 2014.

New York Cosmos
On 24 November 2014, Mkosana signed with NASL club New York Cosmos. His performance through most of the 2015 season earned him a contract extension in September 2015, scoring 5 goals in 19 appearances. The striker scored seven goals and added one assist across all competitions for the Cosmos in 2015. Notably, Mkosana scored a 90th-minute equalizing goal against MLS club New York City FC in the U.S. Open Cup, propelling the Cosmos to an eventual win in penalty kicks. During his time with the Cosmos, Mkosana helped the New York team win consecutive NASL championships in 2015 and 2016.

IFK Marienhamn
On 30 December 2016, Mkosana signed a one-year contract, with the option of a second, with Finnish Veikkausliiga side IFK Mariehamn. He would make 15 appearances for the Finnish champions, scoring 4 goals including 2 goals in the team's run to the quarterfinals of the 2016–17 Finnish Cup.

Return to New York Cosmos
After a season competing in Finland, Mkosana returned to New York Cosmos in June 2017 to compete in the 2017 Fall season.

Penn FC
Ahead of the 2018 season, Mkosana returned to Harrisburg signing with the newly branded Penn FC (formerly the Harrisburg City Islanders) in the USL Championship. Despite a difficult season, Mkosana still managed to lead the team in goals, scoring 11 goals through 29 appearances.

Louisville City
After finishing a single season with Penn FC, Mkosana moved to USL champions, Louisville City FC ahead of the 2019 season. Traded mid-season, Mkosana scored 5 goals in 16 appearances.

Return to Tampa Bay Rowdies
Despite good performances for Louisville, Mkosana rejoined the Rowdies midway through the 2019 season as part of a trade that saw Antoine Hoppenot go to Louisville. In the 2021 Eastern Conference Final, Mkosana scored twice against Louisville to spur the Rowdies to victory. His first goal in the match came just three minutes after he entered off the bench, and the second goal was the equalizer deep into stoppage time. The two goals made Mkosana the USL Championship's all-time leading scorer as a substitute. Mkosana re-signed with the Rowdies on 20 January 2023.

International career
Mkosana received his first international call-up to the Zimbabwe national team for its African Cup of Nations qualifier on 9 September 2018.

Career statistics

Honors

New York Cosmos
North American Soccer League Supporters' Trophy: 2015
North American Soccer League Soccer Bowl: 2015, 2016

References

External links
 
 New York Cosmos profile

1987 births
Living people
Zimbabwean footballers
Zimbabwean expatriate footballers
Dartmouth Big Green men's soccer players
Penn FC players
Louisville City FC players
Tampa Bay Rowdies players
New York Cosmos (2010) players
Expatriate soccer players in the United States
Chicago Fire FC draft picks
USL League Two players
USL Championship players
North American Soccer League players
Association football forwards